Marjut Rimminen (born 1944) is a Finnish-born animator and film director living and working in London.

Rimminen studied graphic design at the Helsinki College of Applied Arts and graduated in 1968. She started making animated television commercials, one of which was named the Best Commercial at the 1972 Animafest Zagreb. The following year Marjut joined Halas & Batchelor Animation in the United Kingdom, and has lived and worked in London ever since.

Marjut Rimminen has made short films for Channel Four Television as well as directed and animated TV spots for the Finnish advertising market. Her work has been screened at numerous film festivals around the world, and she has been member in several festival juries.

Marjut Rimminen has given tuition at the National Film & Television School, the Royal College of Art and the Institute of Art & Design in Surrey. She has given master classes and workshops in animation around the world.

Rimminen was married to British animation producer Dick Arnall (1944–2007).

A retrospective of Rimminen's work was screened at the 1998 Tampere Film Festival, Finland, and the 9th International Festival of Animated Film in Stuttgart, Germany.

Filmography
 1972 Trip to Eternity, with Sakari Rimminen, 3 min, 16mm
honourable mention, 1973 Lübeck Film Festival
 1982 The Bridge, drawn animation, 8 mins, 35mm 
Finnish State Film Award 1983  
 1986 I'm not a Feminist, but… Channel 4 co-production with Christine Roche, 7 mins, 35mm
Special Jury Prize, 1986 Espinho International Animation Festival
 1987 Blind Justice – Some Protection for Channel 4, 9 mins, 16mm
 1989 The Frog King, 7 mins, 35mm
Winner, Magic Mirror animated fairy-tale competition
 1991 The Stain, with Christine Roche, 11 mins, 16mm
Special Jury Prize, 1992 Hiroshima International Animation Festival
Special Jury Prize, 1992 San Francisco International Film Festival
 1996 Many Happy Returns for Channel Four Television, 8min23s
Grand Prix, 1997 Tampere International Short Film Festival
2nd prize for Best Computer Assisted Animation by Independent, 
1997 Los Angeles World Animation Celebration
Jury special prize, 1997 Kraków International Short Film Festival
The Grand Animation Prize, 1997 Vila do Conde Short Film Festival
Diploma, 1997 Krok International Animation Festival
First prize, 1997 Fantoche International Animation Festival
Honorary distinction for the Best Animation, 1997 Drama International Short Film Festival
Finalist, 1998 British Animation Awards
Director's Choice Award for the Most Innovative Animation Work, the Images Festival of Independent Film and Video 1998, Toronto, Canada
 1996 Absolut Panushka. Interpretations on the classic Absolut Vodka bottle by 24 award-winning animators around the world, 10 seconds each
Joop Geesing Prize for the Best Campaign, Holland Animation Film Festival, 1996
Best animation produced for the internet, 1997 Los Angeles World Animation Celebration
Finalist, Cool Design Award, in 1997 Cool Site of the Year Competition
Honorary mention, 1997 Communications Art Interactive Design Annual
 1996 Urpo & Turpo, with Liisa Helminen, 6 x 9 mins, 35mm
The Bronze Elephant, 1997 Hyderabad Children's Film Festival, India
Finalist, Best Film & Best Soundtrack, 1988 British Animation Awards
 1998 Mixed Feelings for Channel Four, 12 mins, BetaSP
 2001 Red Ribbon AIDS/HIV episode for UNICEF, 1 min, Digibeta
 2007 Learned by Heart (Sydämeen kätketty) for Yleisradio

Sources

External links

Finnish animators
Finnish animated film directors
British animated film directors
British animators
British women animators
Finnish women animators
British women film directors
Finnish women film directors
1944 births
Living people
Finnish expatriates in the United Kingdom